Sergio Brighenti (23 September 1932 – 10 October 2022) was an Italian football player and coach. As a professional player, Brighenti played as a forward at both club and international level, before beginning his coaching career.

Playing career
Making his professional debut in 1949, Brighenti played for Modena, Internazionale, Triestina, Padova, Sampdoria and Torino, winning two consecutive Serie A titles with Inter in 1953 and 1954. Brighenti scored a total of 155 goals in 363 career league games. He was also top-scorer in Serie A once throughout his career, during the 1960–61 season, scoring 27 goals.

Brighenti also earned nine caps for Italy between 1959 and 1961, scoring two goals.

Style of play
Brighenti was a quick, hardworking, and dynamic centre-forward, with good technical ability, and a powerful, accurate shot, who was known for his team–play as well as his eye for goal; as such, his role was more akin to that of a "centravanti di manovra," in Italian football jargon (literally translating to "manoeuvring centre-forward"), which was similar to that of a second striker, and a precursor to the modern false 9 role.

Coaching career
Brighenti retired as a player in 1965, and began his first football management job with Varese in 1968. Brighenti was manager at Varese twice, and also managed Seregno and Lecco.

Personal life and death
Sergio Brighenti was born in Modena on 23 September 1932. His older brother was fellow player Renato Brighenti.

Brighenti died on 10 October 2022, at the age of 90.

Honours
Inter Milan
Serie A: 1952–53, 1953–54

Individual
Serie A top scorer: 1960–61

References

External links
 
 RSSSF
 Profile at Enciclopedia del Calcio 
 FIGC Profile 

1932 births
2022 deaths
Italian footballers
Italy international footballers
Italian football managers
Serie A players
Calcio Padova players
Inter Milan players
Modena F.C. players
U.S. Triestina Calcio 1918 players
Torino F.C. players
U.C. Sampdoria players
Calcio Lecco 1912 managers
U.S.D. 1913 Seregno Calcio managers
S.S.D. Varese Calcio managers
Association football forwards
Sportspeople from Modena